View from the Window at Le Gras is a heliographic image and the oldest surviving camera photograph. It was created by French inventor Nicéphore Niépce in 1826 in Saint-Loup-de-Varennes, France, and shows parts of the buildings and surrounding countryside of his estate, Le Gras, as seen from a high window.

Creation

Niépce captured the scene with a camera obscura projected onto a  pewter plate thinly coated with bitumen of Judea, a naturally occurring asphalt. The bitumen hardened in the brightly lit areas, but in the dimly lit areas it remained soluble and could be washed away with a mixture of oil of lavender and white petroleum. A very long exposure in the camera was required. Sunlight strikes the buildings on opposite sides, suggesting an exposure that lasted about eight hours, which has become the traditional estimate. A researcher who studied Niépce's notes and recreated his processes found that the exposure must have continued for several days.

Early history
In late 1826, Niépce visited the United Kingdom. He showed this and several other specimens of his work to botanical illustrator Francis Bauer. View from the Window at Le Gras was the only example of a camera photograph; the rest were contact-exposed copies of artwork. Bauer encouraged him to present his "heliography" process to the Royal Society. Niépce wrote and submitted a paper but was unwilling to reveal any specific details in it, so the Royal Society rejected it based on a rule that prohibited presentations about undisclosed secret processes. Before returning to France, Niépce gave his paper and the specimens to Bauer. Niépce died suddenly in 1833, due to a stroke.

After the pioneering photographic processes of Louis Daguerre and Henry Fox Talbot were publicly announced in January 1839, Bauer championed Niépce's right to be acknowledged as the first inventor of a process for making permanent photographs. On March 9, 1839, the specimens were finally exhibited at the Royal Society. After Bauer's death in 1840 they passed through several hands and were occasionally exhibited as historical curiosities. View from the Window at Le Gras was last publicly shown in 1905 and then fell into oblivion for nearly fifty years.

Re-emergence

Historians Helmut Gernsheim and his wife, Alison Gernsheim, tracked down the photograph in 1952 and brought it to prominence, reinforcing the claim that Niépce is the inventor of photography. They had an expert at the Kodak Research Laboratory make a modern photographic copy, but it proved extremely difficult to produce an adequate representation of all that could be seen when inspecting the actual plate. Helmut Gernsheim heavily retouched one of the copy prints to clean it up and make the scene more comprehensible, and until the late 1970s he allowed only that enhanced version to be published. It became apparent that at some point in time after the copying in 1952, the plate was disfigured and acquired bumps near three of its corners, which caused light to reflect in ways that interfered with the visibility of those areas and of the image as a whole.

During the 1950s and early 1960s, the Gernsheims toured the photograph to several exhibitions in continental Europe. In 1963, Harry Ransom purchased most of the Gernsheims' photography collection for the University of Texas at Austin. Although it has rarely traveled since then, in 2012–2013 it visited Mannheim, Germany, as part of an exhibition entitled The Birth of Photography—Highlights of the Helmut Gernsheim Collection. It is normally on display in the main lobby of the Harry Ransom Center in Austin, Texas.

Scientific analysis and conservation
During a study and conservation project in 2002–2003, scientists at the Getty Conservation Institute examined the photograph using X-ray fluorescence spectroscopy, reflectance Fourier transform infrared spectroscopy, and other techniques. They confirmed that the image consists of bitumen and that the metal plate is pewter (tin alloyed with lead, as well as trace amounts of iron, copper, and nickel).  The Institute also designed and built the elaborate display case system that now houses the artifact in a continuously monitored, stabilized, oxygen-free environment.

In 2007, scientists from the Louvre Museum published an analysis of the photograph using ion beam analysis, with data taken on their 2 MV electrostatic accelerator. This showed the details of the oxidation process that was corroding the image.

Importance
In 2003, Life listed View from the Window at Le Gras among 100 Photographs that Changed the World. In an article for Art on Paper, View from the Window at Le Gras was said to have a "fair claim" as the first photograph.

See also
History of photography
List of photographs considered the most important

References

External links

The Niépce Heliograph at the Harry Ransom Center

 Introducing ‘The Niépce Heliograph’

1826 in France
1826 works
History of photography
Black-and-white photographs
Photography in France
Monochrome photography
1820s photographs
Landscape photographs